The 1991 NCAA Division I-AA football season, part of college football in the United States organized by the National Collegiate Athletic Association at the Division I-AA level, began in August 1991, and concluded with the 1991 NCAA Division I-AA Football Championship Game on December 21, 1991, at Paulson Stadium in Statesboro, Georgia. The Youngstown State Penguins won their first I-AA championship, defeating the Marshall Thundering Herd by a score of 25−17.

Notable changes

Conference changes

Conference standings

Conference champions

Postseason
Only the top four teams in the field were seeded, and thus assured of home games in their first round games. The location of the final, the Georgia Southern Eagles' Paulson Stadium, had been predetermined via a three-year agreement the university reached with the NCAA in February 1989.

NCAA Division I-AA playoff bracket

* Next to team name denotes host institution

* Next to score denotes host overtime period

Source:

References